Shakil ur Rahman Khan (15 February 1969 – 16 November 2021) was elevated as Judge of the Lahore High Court and previously he was the 36th Advocate General Punjab, appointed by Governor of the Punjab on 7 March 2016. As Advocate General Punjab he was also an ex-officio chairman of the Punjab Bar Council. He had already served in this office (2009-2012) as Additional Advocate General Punjab and resigned from the post to continue his law practice as Advocate Supreme Court of Pakistan. He has also served the Punjab Healthcare Commission, PTCL and M/o NHSR &C as Senior Legal Advisor.

He was the son of former Justice Supreme Court of Pakistan and Chief Justice Lahore High Court, Justice Khalil ur Rahman Khan. His father had not taken oath under PCO of dictator General Musharaf. His younger brother is a doctor, Dr. Farid ur Rehman Khan. His younger brother is currently practicing as a doctor at his own clinic situated at Holy Family Road, Rawalpindi.

Education and early life

Hailing from Lahore, born on 15 February 1969, after graduation he completed his law degree LL.B. from University Law College, Punjab University, Lahore.

References

1969 births
2021 deaths
People from Lahore
Pakistani judges
Pakistani lawyers
Lawyers